The Ilbert Bill was a bill formally introduced on 9 February 1883 during the Viceroyship of the Marquess of Ripon, which was drafted by Sir Courtenay Peregine Ilbert, the legal member of the Council of the Governor-General of India. It concerned the jurisdiction of Magistrates or Sessions Judges to try charges against "European British subjects" if they were themselves not European.

It is named after Courtenay Ilbert, who had originally proposed it for a revision of the previous Indian Criminal Procedure Act from 1861. Within this act, British subjects were not allowed to be tried under a court presided over by an Indian magistrate. The changes presented in the Ilbert Bill reduced the limitations for these officials, allowing British subjects to be tried by Indian magistrates who had reached seniority within the civil service. The bill was promoted by Lord Ripon who had been instructed by prime minister William Gladstone to reserve some of the law's more restrictive policies over native Indian magistrates.

However, the introduction of the bill led to intense opposition in Britain and from Britons living in India that ultimately played on ethnic tensions. The bill was ultimately enacted in 1884, but in a severely compromised state. The bitter controversy deepened antagonism between the British and Indians and was a prelude to the formation of the Indian National Congress one year later.

Controversy
Courtenay Ilbert drafted the "Bill to amend the Code of Criminal Procedure, 1882, so far as it relates to the exercise of jurisdiction over European British subjects", which subsequently became known as the Ilbert bill. On 2 February 1883 he moved for leave to introduce the bill and it was formally introduced on 9 February 1883. Following the release of this new motion, controversies started to circulate between natives and British residents with reference to race and gender.

Race 
The most vocal opponents of the bill were British tea and indigo plantation owners in Bengal, led by Griffith Evans, a Calcutta barrister. The European and Anglo-Indian Defence Association (which drew much of its membership from such plantation owners) was formed as a lobbying group to campaign against the Bill. Sir Bartle Frere, another vocal opponent, stated that the Ilbert Bill would "raise dangerous race hatred by inculcating the idea that justice which is good enough for natives is good enough for Europeans". The heat of the general protests was at its strongest on 28 February 1883 during a town hall meeting put on by the Bengal Chamber of Calcutta in which several emotional speeches were given. Other demonstrations continued to occur drawing in anywhere from 75,000 to 250,000 protesters. Deep racial prejudices became much more prevalent through propaganda declaring that Indian judges were unfit and untrustworthy regarding cases against European defendants.  

Protests, rallies, and discourse on the subject included several racist tropes, such as cartoons of Indian magistrates with animal-like features, and using animal terms such as 'wily snakes' and 'unchangeable, spotted leopards.' Opponents of the bill also feared that as the number of natives seeking an education was increasing from European efforts in that regard, more magistrates would soon become eligible to preside over trials with British defendants.  

On the other hand, the majority of the native Indians strongly supported the bill, and the European sense of racial superiority frustrated and infuriated them. The British government introduced European systems of education in place in order to create a well-educated Indian upper-class and the Ilbert Bill would have given more authority to Indian magistrates who were the product of these systems. Yet despite these frustrations, reports show that the Indian supporters of the bill were neither as vocal nor as well organized as the bill’s opponents.

Press 
News outlets played a big role in fomenting the dispute around the bill, sparking outrage in Britain and in India, as the political press "actively endeavored to influence government legislation for India" for the first time. Just three days after the bill was first passed, the Times released an article attacking the changes, which was telegraphed to India and distributed to papers such as the Statesman and the Pioneer. The Gazette, the Times, and other newspapers continued to release statements condemning the bill and criticizing Lord Ripon’s desire to "please the native community at any cost". The widespread news reports invoked more opposition from those in Britain.

Gender 
Another flashpoint was introduced when rumours began circulating that an English woman had been raped by an Indian man in Calcutta. In reference to the Indian Rebellion of 1857, when it was alleged that English women and girls were raped by Indian sepoys, many Britons living in India expressed great concern over the humiliation that British females would have to face appearing before Indian judges in the case of rape trials. The British press in India spread wild rumours about how Indian judges would abuse their power to establish harems which they would then fill with British women. The allegations that Indian judges could not be trusted in dealing with cases involving British women aroused considerable opposition against the bill. John Beames, a long serving civil servant in India, stated "It is intensely distasteful and humiliating to all Europeans...it will tend seriously to impair the prestige of British rule in India...it conceals the elements of revolution which may ere long prove the ruin of the country".

British women in India who opposed the bill further argued that Bengali women, whom they frequently characterized as "ignorant", were neglected by their men, and that Bengali babu should therefore not be given the right to judge cases involving British women. Bengali women who supported the bill responded by claiming that they were more educated than the British women opposed to the bill, and pointed out that more Indian women had academic degrees than British women did at the time, alluding to the fact that the University of Calcutta became one of the first universities to admit female graduates to its degree programmes in 1878, before any of the British universities had done the same. Thousands of Bengali women from organizations in Poona and Bombay also signed petitions in favor of the bill, which they "wholeheartedly supported on humanitarian grounds'. Opposition and controversy continued throughout 1883, which forced Lord Ripon to reevaluate and offer a compromise version of the bill.

Resolution
At first, as a result of popular disapproval of the Ilbert Bill by a majority of British women living in India, Viceroy Ripon (who had introduced the Bill) passed an amendment, whereby a jury of 50% Europeans was required if an Indian judge was to face a European on the dock. Finally, a solution was adopted by way of compromise: jurisdiction to try Europeans would be conferred on European and Indian District Magistrates and Sessions Judges alike. However, a defendant would in all cases have the right to claim trial by a jury of which at least half the members must be European.

The bill was then passed on 25 January 1884 as the Criminal Procedure Code Amendment Act 1884, coming into force on 1 May of that year. The controversy and amendment to the Ilbert Bill helped to promote Indian national awareness and a demand for greater Indian autonomy, and the Indian National Congress (INC) was formed a year later.

Further reading
 The Text of the original "Ilbert Bill" is reproduced in: 
 Ilbert Bill from Encyclopædia Britannica.
 
 
 
 
 
 Review:

See also 
 Brajendranath De
 Behari Lal Gupta
 Courtenay Ilbert
 Stereotypes of South Asians

References

1883 in British India
Anti-Indian sentiment
1884 in British India
Legislation in British India